Sir Skeffington Smyth, 1st Baronet, was an MP in the Parliament of Ireland, for Mullingar, in County Westmeath, serving from 1779 until 1783. Sir Skeffington Smyth represented Belturbet, Co. Cavan from 1783 until 1790, and Galway from 1790 until his death in 1797.

Skeffington Edward Smyth was born in Tinny Park, Wicklow,  County Wicklow, the son of James Smyth, a Member of Parliament of Ireland for Antrim Borough and Dundalk (elected at the same time he chose to sit as a member for Antrim), and Mary Agar. Skeffington Smyth was the grandson of Anglican Bishop of Down, Rev. Dr. Edward Smyth and Mary Skeffington.

Skeffington Smyth married Margaret Daly and they had a daughter Maria Elizabeth Smyth who married James Daly, 1st Baron Dunsandle and Clanconal, who was MP for Galway Borough.

Sir Skeffington Smyth was made 1st Baronet in 1776; he was also a member of the Privy Council of Ireland from 1785. He died aged 52 in Co. Meath on 9 September 1797. As he had no son, the baronetcy ceased on his death.

References

1745 births
1797 deaths
People from County Wicklow
Members of the Parliament of Ireland (pre-1801) for County Longford constituencies
Members of the Parliament of Ireland (pre-1801) for County Westmeath constituencies
Baronets in the Baronetage of Ireland